Florin Daniel Dumbravă (born 19 February 1995) is a Romanian professional footballer who plays as a defender for FC Brașov.

Honours
Corona Brașov
Liga III: 2020–21
Liga IV: 2019–20

References

External links
 

1995 births
Living people
Sportspeople from Brașov
Romanian footballers
Association football defenders
Liga I players
Liga II players
FC Brașov (1936) players
Sepsi OSK Sfântu Gheorghe players
ACS Poli Timișoara players
SR Brașov players
CSM Corona Brașov footballers
FC Brașov (2021) players